Guy Hardy is a Canadian politician. Hardy was elected to the National Assembly of Quebec in the 2014 election. He represented the electoral district of Saint-François as a member of the Quebec Liberal Party, but did not run for re-election in 2018.

References

Quebec Liberal Party MNAs
Living people
21st-century Canadian politicians
Year of birth missing (living people)